Zane Eglīte (born December 10, 1984 in Jūrmala) is a Latvian women's basketball player with the Latvia women's national basketball team. She competed with the team at the 2008 Summer Olympics, where she scored 17 points in 5 games.

References

1984 births
Living people
Latvian women's basketball players
Olympic basketball players of Latvia
Basketball players at the 2008 Summer Olympics
People from Jūrmala
Latvian expatriates in Spain
University of Latvia alumni